Montserrat Garriga Cabrero (1865-1956) was a Cuban-Spanish botanist.  

She was born in Cienfuegos, Cuba, but moved to Catalonia with her family when she was a child.
She collected plants from around the world, especially alpine flora, and collaborated closely with botany professor Pius Font i Quer (1888-1964).

References

1865 births
1956 deaths
20th-century Spanish botanists
19th-century Spanish botanists
Spanish women botanists